Luise Krüger (January 11, 1915 – June 13, 2001) was a female, German athlete, who competed mainly in the javelin. She won the bronze medal for her native country at the 1934 Women's World Games in London and the silver medal at the 1936 Summer Olympics held in Berlin, Germany,  behind teammate Tilly Fleischer. She was born and died in Dresden.

References

External links 
 

1915 births
2001 deaths
German female javelin throwers
Olympic silver medalists for Germany
Olympic athletes of Germany
Athletes (track and field) at the 1936 Summer Olympics
European Athletics Championships medalists
Medalists at the 1936 Summer Olympics
Olympic silver medalists in athletics (track and field)
Women's World Games medalists
Athletes from Dresden